Joël Stalter (born 8 July 1992) is a French professional golfer.

Stalter played college golf at the University of California, Berkeley where he was a two-time All-American and won five tournaments. He represented Europe in the 2013 Palmer Cup.

Stalter turned professional after graduating in 2014 and began playing on the Challenge Tour. He earned his first victory at the 2016 Swedish Challenge. Stalter finished 16th in the Challenge Tour Road to Oman to earn a place on the European Tour for 2017.

In July 2020, Stalter won the Euram Bank Open. This was a dual-ranking event and gave him his first victory on the European Tour.

Amateur wins
2011 Austrian Amateur
2013 Arizona Intercollegiate, John Burns Intercollegiate, Alister MacKenzie Invitational
2014 Arizona Intercollegiate, National Invitational Tournament

Source:

Professional wins (3)

European Tour wins (1)

1Dual-ranking event with the Challenge Tour

Challenge Tour wins (2)

1Dual-ranking event with the European Tour

Challenge Tour playoff record (1–0)

French Tour wins (1)

Results in major championships

CUT = missed the halfway cut
"T" = tied

Team appearances
European Boys' Team Championship (representing France): 2008
Palmer Cup (representing Europe): 2013
European Amateur Team Championship (representing France): 2013

See also
2016 Challenge Tour graduates
2022 European Tour Qualifying School graduates

References

External links

French male golfers
California Golden Bears men's golfers
European Tour golfers
Sportspeople from Moselle (department)
People from Thionville
People from Amnéville
1992 births
Living people